Ty Fryfogle (born January 28, 1999) is an American football wide receiver for the Kansas City Chiefs of the National Football League (NFL). He played college football at Indiana.

Early life and high school
Fryfogle grew up in Lucedale, Mississippi and attended George County High School. As a senior, he caught 89 passes for 1,430 yards and 13 touchdowns and was named first-team all-state. Fryfogle committed to play college football at Indiana over Ole Miss and Idaho.

College career
Despite initially considering redshirting, Fryfogle played in eight games as a true freshman, catching one pass for 13 yards. He had 29 receptions for 381 yards with three touchdowns in his sophomore season. As a junior, Fryfogle caught 45 passes for 604 yards and three touchdowns. He was named the Big Ten Conference Offensive Player of the Week on November 14, 2020, after catching 11 passes for 200 yards and two touchdowns against Michigan State.

College statistics

Professional career

Dallas Cowboys
Fryfogle signed with the Dallas Cowboys as an undrafted free agent on May 3, 2022. He was waived/injured on August 15, 2022 and placed on injured reserve. He was released on August 23.

Kansas City Chiefs
On January 9, 2023, Fryfogle signed a reserve/future contract with the Kansas City Chiefs.

Personal life
Fryfogle was born on January 28,1999 to Jacqueline Bradley and Trey Fryfogle.
Fryfogle's father Trey played college football for Ole Miss from 2000 to 2002.

References

External links
 Dallas Cowboys bio
Indiana Hoosiers bio

1999 births
Living people
American football wide receivers
Dallas Cowboys players
Indiana Hoosiers football players
Kansas City Chiefs players
Players of American football from Mississippi
People from Lucedale, Mississippi